Harbin railway station is a railway station on the Jingha railway, Binsui Railway, Labin Railway, Binbei Railway and Binzhou Railway. The station is in Nangang District, Harbin, Heilongjiang, China.

History
Songhuajiang station was opened in October 1899. It was renamed Harbin Station in July 1903. It was renovated in 1960, 1972, 1989, and 2002. In 2015, construction of new Harbin railway station began, using the design of the original Art Nouveau style in the 1903-built old station. The north and south terminals both completed renovations in 2017, with the terminals of the newly built Harbin railway station opened for public service. 

On 26 October 1909, Korean nationalist An Jung-geun assassinated Itō Hirobumi, the first Prime Minister of Japan, on the platform at Harbin Station. Itō had been Japan's Resident-General in Korea until a few months before his assassination. A memorial hall honoring An Jung-geun was opened on Sunday, 19 January 2014 in Harbin. The hall, a  room, features photos and memorabilia.

Metro station
Line 2 of Harbin Metro opened on September 19, 2021.

See also
Chinese Eastern Railway
Harbin Russians
South Manchuria Railway
Harbin Subway

References

External links

Harbin Railway Station Official website

Railway stations in China opened in 1899
Stations on the Beijing–Harbin Railway
Stations on the Harbin–Qiqihar Intercity Railway
Railway stations in Harbin
1899 establishments in China